Challenge 12 is a 12-metre class yacht that competed in the 1983 Louis Vuitton Cup.

References

12-metre class yachts
Sailing yachts of Australia
Louis Vuitton Cup yachts